Directions in Groove is the debut extended play by Australian acid jazz band D.I.G. and was released in 1992. The album peaked at number 89 on the ARIA charts.

Reception
Linc Dubwise from The Canberra Times said "[the] acid jazz group... delights in the potential of jazz as accessible, entertaining, populist and, above all, danceable. The acid label is no more than a convenient identifier for the current generation of artists melding elements of jazz, fusion, funk, rap, soul and world music."

Track listing
 "Re Invent Yourself" - 5:20
 "Sweet Thing"	- 5:53
 "Taylor's Cube" - 4:41
 "Heaven On Earth" - 6:36
 "Freezerville" - 4:30

Charts

Release history

References

1992 debut EPs
EPs by Australian artists
Directions in Groove albums